Men's ice hockey tournaments have been staged at the Olympic Games since 1920. The men's tournament was introduced at the 1920 Summer Olympics, and permanently added to the Winter Olympic Games in 1924. The United States has participated in 22 of 23 tournaments, sending 43 goaltenders and 282 skaters.

For the first two tournaments, the United States sent club amateur teams with additional players from other squads.  After sitting out the 1928 tournament, they returned in 1932 with a team made up almost entirely of players attending college in the US.  The early American teams were successful, winning three silver medals and a bronze in the first five tournaments.  In 1948, controversy struck when the US sent two teams to the Olympics.  Two competing bodies, the American Hockey Association and the Amateur Athletic Union, each claimed that their team had the right to represent the United States. As a compromise, the AHA team was permitted to compete, but they would be prohibited from qualifying for a medal.

In 1960, an unheralded American squad defeated the Canadian and Soviet squads on American soil en route to their first Olympic gold medal.  The next several years were not as successful, and the Americans fell in the rankings; when the United States won silver in 1972, it did so from the B Pool, becoming the first B Pool squad to medal in an Olympic tournament.  In 1980, Herb Brooks, the last man cut from the team that won gold in 1960, was named coach, and selected a team of college hockey players.  The Americans shocked the world by first upsetting the heavily favored Soviet team 4–3, and then they defeated Finland for the gold medal.  The "Miracle on Ice", as the game against the Soviets came to be known, was later named as the greatest moment in international hockey history by the IIHF, and the story was later turned into two motion pictures, Miracle on Ice and Miracle.

The Olympic Games were originally intended for amateur athletes, so the players of the National Hockey League (NHL) and other professional leagues were not allowed to compete. The countries that benefited most were the Soviet Bloc countries of Eastern Europe, where top athletes were state-sponsored while retaining their status as amateurs. In 1986, the International Olympic Committee (IOC) voted to allow all athletes to compete in Olympic Games, starting in 1988.  The NHL decided not to allow all players to participate in 1988, 1992 or 1994, because doing so would force the league to halt play during the Olympics. An agreement was reached in 1995 that allowed NHL players to compete in the Olympics, starting with the 1998 Games in Nagano, Japan.  Since that time, the Americans have won two silver medals, losing both times to Canada in the gold medal game in North America (2002 in Salt Lake City and 2010 in Vancouver).  National teams are co-ordinated by USA Hockey and players are chosen by the team's management staff.

The United States has won two gold medals, eight silver medals and one bronze medal in men's ice hockey; the Americans have won more silver medals than any other nation.  Four players have been inducted into the Hockey Hall of Fame, seven into the IIHF Hall of Fame and sixty-two individuals into the United States Hockey Hall of Fame.  In addition, two teams have been inducted into the US Hockey Hall of Fame and the United States Olympic Hall of Fame: the gold medal winning 1960 and 1980 teams.  Two players—Chris Chelios and Keith Tkachuk—have played on four teams. According to the IOC database, 176 men have won medals; ten players—Bill Cleary, Chris Drury, Herbert Drury, John Garrison, John Mayasich, Dick Meredith, Weldon Olson, Brian Rafalski, Richard Rodenheiser, and Frank Synott—have won two medals. Keith Tkachuk holds the record for most games played, having dressed for 23 games in 1992, 1998, 2002, and 2006. Herbert Drury leads American Olympians in goals, having scored 33 goals in 1920 and 1924 (before assists were counted); Bruce Cunliffe scored 23 points (17 goals and 6 assists) in 1948, and Bill Christian recorded 12 assists in 1960 and 1964.

Key

Goaltenders

Reserve goaltenders

These goaltenders were named to the Olympic roster, but did not receive any ice time during games.

Skaters

See also
 List of United States national ice hockey team rosters
 List of Olympic women's ice hockey players for the United States

Notes

Footnotes

References

External links
 USA Hockey - Official website

Ice hockey
United States
United States

United States national ice hockey team